Guy R. Strong (born, June 15, 1930) is an American former basketball player and coach. Strong, a Kentucky native, graduated from Estill County's Irvine High School in 1948. Traveling to the University of Kentucky he was one of five players, including Bill Spivey, who made the final cut during a two-day session. He played for two years including the 1951 National Championship team. After his third year he served in the Korean War, before transferring to Eastern Kentucky to close out his collegiate career. As a coach in High School and College he compiled a 541–355 record. He was also the first coach to win a national championship at Kentucky Wesleyan College, a tradition the school continued by winning 7 more, the most in Division II.

Head coaching record

College

References

1930 births
Living people
American men's basketball coaches
American men's basketball players
Basketball coaches from Kentucky
Basketball players from Kentucky
Guards (basketball)
Eastern Kentucky Colonels men's basketball coaches
Eastern Kentucky Colonels men's basketball players
High school basketball coaches in Kentucky
Kentucky Wesleyan Panthers men's basketball coaches
Kentucky Wildcats men's basketball players
Oklahoma State Cowboys basketball coaches
People from Irvine, Kentucky